Krysiak is a Polish-language surname. It is a patronymic surname of Northern Poland origin  formed by the addition of the diminutive suffix "-ak" to the diminutive form Kryś of father's first name Krzysztof (Christopher) or Krystian (Christian).

Notable people with this surname include:

Artur Krysiak (born 1989), Polish footballer
Carolyn J. Krysiak (born 1939), American politician
 (1912-1944), Polish World War II underground fighter
Wojciech Krysiak (born 1998), Polish gymnast

References

Polish-language surnames
Patronymic surnames